Solar hot water is water heated using only energy from the Sun. Solar energy heats up large panels called thermal collectors commonly known as solar panels. The energy is transferred through a fluid (often water) to a reservoir tank for storage and subsequent use. It is then used to heat water for commercial or domestic use and also as an energy input for heating and cooling devices and for industrial 'process heat' applications. In domestic solar hot water applications, the thermal collectors can either be coupled together with the hot water storage tank on a rooftop (known as a "close coupled" or "thermosiphon" configuration), or separated from the storage tank, in a "split system" configuration.

Solar hot water systems are designed to reduce energy consumption, a significant source of greenhouse gas and carbon emissions. In the case of Victoria, for example, switching from electric to solar hot water could save 20% of the state's total greenhouse gas emissions.

Despite being an excellent  resource, the penetration of solar water heaters in the Australian domestic market is only about 4% or 5%, with new dwellings accounting for most sales.

During the 1950s, Australia’s Commonwealth Scientific and Industrial Research Organisation (CSIRO) carried out world leading research into flat plate solar water heaters. A solar water heater manufacturing industry was subsequently established in Australia and a large proportion of the manufactured product was exported. Four of the original companies are still in business and the manufacturing base has now expanded to 24 companies.

Heating of water is the largest single source of greenhouse gas emissions from the average Australian home, accounting for around 28% of home energy use (excluding the family car). The Australian government estimates that installing a climate-friendly solar-powered hot water system could help households save $300 to $700 of electricity bills each year.

Australian government's solar hot water rebate program

The solar hot water rebate program for financial year 2009 offered a $1,600 rebate for the installation of solar powered hot water systems.

The rebate can be collected once the installation has been finished, if the household meets the necessary requirements stated below:

 The solar hot water system is a substitute for a previous electric heating system.
 The application and the installation process has taken place within the dates the rebate is offered.
 The household is a principal place of residence.
 The solar or heat pump hot water system is eligible for minimum 20 Renewable Energy Certificates (RECs).
 A licensed plumber or electrician is consulted for the installation.

Once the system is installed, the applicant has up to six months to submit the application form with the purchase receipt attached to it.

The mandatory renewable energy target scheme was created by the Australian government to mandate energy retailers to the usage of renewables. Each solar heating system is accredited a certain number of RECs depending on how effective it is and in which of the four climate zones one resides. Each zone is associated with a number of post codes ranging across the whole continent.

Once issued, the RECs can be sold to energy retailers. While the market value of RECs is subject to variation even residential sized installations, depending on the current market conditions and the performance of the installed unit, often amounts to payments of $900 or more.

Solar hot water in the Australian states

ACT
The ACT Energy Wise program, run by the ACT Government, offers rebates to house owners or tenants that do energy saving improvements for at least $2,000 to their residence, such as insulation, inserting double glazed windows, installation of solar, gas or electric heat pump water heating systems.

Only the first $1,000 of the cost of the installation of the water heating system (which replaces the existing electric heating system) can be used to calculate the $2,000 to be used on improvements. This means that to receive the rebate, the householder needs to spend another $1,000 on additional energy savings.

To be eligible the rebate of $500 the householder/tenant must:
 Have an energy audit by HEAT ($30).
 Be able to give detailed information about the residence's energy usage during the past year.
 Be able to show receipts from the renovations and improvements made.
 Lodge the application with attached receipts within six months after the energy audit.
 Not have received any other rebate under another program.

New South Wales
The New South Wales (NSW) Residential rebate program, running from 01/10/2007 to 30/06/2009, offered all house owners in NSW a rebate on systems that were replacing existing electric hot water systems.

More efficient systems (emitting less Greenhouse gas) eligible for more RECs (Renewable Energy Certificate) generated a higher rebate.

Northern Territory
Power and Water Corporation, the principal water and electricity supplier in the Northern Territory, offers an REC buyback scheme on installations of solar water heaters. The buyback must be applied for and assigned less than one year after the installation.

Queensland
The Queensland Government's solar hot water rebate scheme finished on June 30, 2005.

No state rebates are offered at the present, however the Queensland government in 2007 announced the phasing-out of electric hot water systems commencing in 2010. From 2010, Queenslanders who needed to replace their household hot water system due to breakdown were no longer able to install electric systems and instead had to choose from gas, solar or heat pump options. Prior to this, the Queensland government had already banned the installation of electric hot water systems in newly constructed houses; a law which came into effect on 1 March 2006. The ban on electric hot water systems was repealed on January 1, 2013 and currently Queenslanders are permitted to install electric hot water systems.

The Brisbane City Council offered a rebate of $400 from August 30, 2008 to June 1, 2009.

South Australia

In accordance with the South Australian Government rebate scheme, starting January 7, 2008, all installations or replacements of a water heater must be a low-greenhouse one. The rebate scheme is aimed to give less fortunate people a financial incentive to use gas, heat pump or solar energy to heat water.

To be eligible for the $500 rebate, the householder has to hold at least one of the following concession cards:

 Centrelink Health Care Card
 Centrelink Pensioner Concession Card
 DVA Gold Card – Totally and Permanently Incapacitated
 DVA Gold Card - War Widow
 DVA - Extreme Disablement Adjustment

Following to the installation, the householder has up to three months to send in the application to receive the rebate if a criterion listed below is met.

The water heating system does not replace existing one:

The water heating system does replace existing one:

Tasmania
No rebates other than the Federal Government's are offered by the Tasmanian Government at the moment.

Victoria
Sustainability Victoria’s solar hot water program, sponsored by the Victorian government, offers rebates to householders who have installed a system that abides the following criteria:
 Acts as a replacement of a natural gas or LPG water heater with a solar-system
 Is a solar driven pre-heater, which is additional to an existing natural gas of LPG water heating system
 Is a retrofit kit, which is additional to an existing electric water heater

New houses and buildings can get a rebate by selling the RECs their system is eligible for. The Commonwealth government is also offering a $1,000 rebate for the replacement of electric water heating.

Residential and community buildings:

Commercial buildings:

Western Australia

Installing an environmentally friendly, gas-boosted solar water heater that replaces a previous water electric heating system are eligible for rebate from the Government of Western Australia.

See also

 Mitigation of global warming in Australia
 Photovoltaic engineering in Australia
 Renewable energy commercialisation in Australia
 Solar Cities in Australia
 Solar power station in Victoria
 Solar power plants in Central Australia

References

Solar energy in Australia
Water in Australia